Oporowo may refer to the following places:
Oporowo, Leszno County in Greater Poland Voivodeship (west-central Poland)
Oporowo, Szamotuły County in Greater Poland Voivodeship (west-central Poland)
Oporowo, Kuyavian-Pomeranian Voivodeship (north-central Poland)